HAT-P-36,  also referred to as Tuiren is a 12th magnitude G-type main-sequence star estimated to be approximately 958 light-years away from Earth in the constellation Canes Venatici. HAT-P-36 is too faint to be seen with the naked eye, but it is possible to view it with binoculars or a small telescope. In 2012 a hot Jupiter-type exoplanet was discovered orbiting HAT-P-36 with an orbital period of about 1.3 Earth days. In December 2019, HAT-P-36 was named Tuiren and its planetary companion, HAT-P-36b, was named Bran as a result of Ireland's contribution to the 2019 NameExoWorlds campaign. Bran has a mass approximately 1.8 times that of Jupiter and a radius 1.2 times larger.

Etymology

HAT-P-36 and its planet are named after characters from The Birth of Bran, a story in the book Irish Fairy Tales by James Stephens. The book is a re-telling of various stories from Irish folklore. Tuiren was the aunt of the mythical hero Fionn mac Cumhaill and was turned into a hound by the fairy Uchtdealbh after Tuiren married her husband. Bran and Sceólan were the two puppies mothered by Tuiren while she was a dog. They were cousins of Fionn mac Cumhaill. The names were proposed by John Murphy, a teacher at Regina Mundi College, Cork.

Planets

HAT-P-36b (Bran) was discovered in 2012 by the HATNet Project using the transit method. A search for transit timing variation did not result in detection of additional planets in the system as at 2021. Surprisingly, a planetary orbital period increase by 0.014 seconds per year was detected by 2021.

References

G-type main-sequence stars
Canes Venatici
Stars with proper names
Planetary systems with one confirmed planet
Planetary transit variables